Richard Vautrey is a doctor who was Chair of the British Medical Association's (BMA) General Practitioners Committee. He is a nationally elected member of the BMA Council. He works as a general practitioner (GP) in Leeds and he is an assistant medical secretary of Leeds Local Medical Committee.

Background
In his eighth year as deputy chair of the General Practitioners Committee he was described by Pulse as ‘the smartest hard working GP politician who puts everyone else in the shade’ and the fourth most influential GP.

He has been Leeds Local Medical Committee secretary and now assistant secretary for 14 years and has been involved in negotiations over the GP contract.

Vautrey is a regularly quoted spokesperson for General Practitioners. In April 2015 he says the fact that 16% of GPs report 'unmanageable stress' is truly startling.  He condemned Basildon and Brentwood CCG's decision to limit GP referrals for vasectomy. In March 2015 he defended the 2004 GP contract.

On 20 July 2017 he was elected as the Chair of the British Medical Association's General Practitioners Committee of England and took up the position immediately.   He resigned on 1 November 2021.

References

21st-century English medical doctors
British general practitioners
Fellows of the Royal College of General Practitioners
Year of birth missing (living people)
Living people
British Medical Association